The Southern Conference men's soccer tournament is the conference championship tournament in men's soccer for the Southern Conference. The winner of the tournament receives the conference's automatic bid to the NCAA Division I men's soccer tournament.

Champions

By year

Notes

References

External links